Laetentur Caeli may refer to:

The final verses of the Latin version of Psalm 96
The Bull of Union with the Greeks issued by Pope Eugene IV in 1439